David Cox (9 July 1809 – 6 December 1885), known as David Cox the Younger, David Cox II or David Cox Jr. to distinguish him from his better-known father David Cox (1783-1859), was an English painter in watercolour, mostly of landscapes.

Born in Dulwich, London and educated at Hereford Grammar School, he was taught to paint and draw by his father, although he used a brighter colour palette than his father.
As well as working around London, where he made several paintings of the Norwood Gypsies and other local colour, his landscapes included Wales, Scotland, the Lake District, Devon, France, Switzerland and Italy.

He exhibited at the Royal Academy from 1827, at the New Society of Painters in Water Colours from 1841 and the Society of Painters in Water Colours from 1848, where he would eventually exhibit 580 works.
He died at his home in Streatham and was buried at West Norwood Cemetery.

References

1809 births
1885 deaths
19th-century English painters
English male painters
People educated at Hereford Cathedral School
Burials at West Norwood Cemetery
19th-century English male artists